Carnival of Souls: The Final Sessions (also simply known as Carnival of Souls) is the seventeenth studio album by American rock band Kiss, released in 1997. It is the band's final album with lead guitarist Bruce Kulick, and their last album with drummer Eric Singer until 2009's Sonic Boom. The album is a departure from the band's classic hard rock style, favoring a dark and dense grunge-oriented sound. It is also the band's last album of their unmasked era.

Overview
The album was recorded between late 1995 and early 1996, but Kiss cancelled its release after committing to a reunion tour with the band's original lineup. Bootleg copies were circulated by fans, prompting the band to officially release the material in 1997 under the title Carnival of Souls: The Final Sessions. According to guitarist Bruce Kulick, the bootleg versions in distribution lacked songs that were part of the official release. There was no accompanying tour to support the album, and none of the songs on Carnival of Souls have ever been performed live by Kiss, though the album's closing track "I Walk Alone" has occasionally been performed live by Eric Singer and Kulick in the Eric Singer Project. "Jungle" and "I Walk Alone" were also performed live by Kulick's former band, Union.

Two former members of the band Black 'N Blue co-wrote songs on Carnival of Souls; vocalist Jaime St. James co-wrote "In My Head", and guitarist Tommy Thayer collaborated on "Childhood's End". Thayer would join Kiss as the band's permanent lead guitarist in 2002. Bruce Kulick provides his first and only lead vocal with the band on "I Walk Alone". Carnival of Souls is the band's longest album at 60 minutes and 11 seconds.

Reception

Guitarist Bruce Kulick wrote on his official website that Carnival of Souls had "people equally vocal about it being their favorite Kiss CD or thinking it's the worst Kiss album ever". The album reached No. 27 on the US Billboard 200 chart and the only single released from the album, "Jungle", made No. 8 on the US Mainstream Rock chart. No music video was made to promote the single, which later won a 1997 Metal Edge Readers' Choice Award for Song of the Year.

Track listing

Personnel
Kiss
Paul Stanley – vocals, rhythm guitar, 12-string acoustic guitar and ukulele on track 5, co-producer
Gene Simmons – vocals, bass, co-producer
Bruce Kulick – vocals, lead guitar; all guitars on tracks 7, 9 and 10, bass and acoustic guitar solo on track 5, all guitars and bass on tracks 2, 6, 8 and 11
Eric Singer – drums, percussion, backing vocals
With
Carole Keiser - choir management on track 4, string arrangement on tracks 5 and 10
The Crossroads Boys Choir - backing vocals on track 4 
Nick Simmons - backing vocals on track 4 
Production
Toby Wright – co-producer, engineer, mixing
David Bryant – assistant engineer
Stephen Marcussen – mastering at Precision Mastering, Hollywood

Charts

Album

Singles

References

External links

1997 albums
Kiss (band) albums
Albums produced by Toby Wright
Albums produced by Paul Stanley
Albums produced by Gene Simmons
Mercury Records albums
Grunge albums